Lake Mogilnoye is a small salt/fresh-water lake on the Kildin Island, Murmansk Oblast, Russia near Kildin Strait. The name literally means 'tomb lake, sepulchral lake' in Russian, and refers to the destruction and plundering being done by British troops to the area during the Finnish War in 1809.

References 

Mogilnoye